was a Japanese politician of the Liberal Democratic Party, a member of the House of Representatives in the Diet (national legislature).

Early life and education
Moriyama was born in Tokyo on 7 November 1927. Her father was a businessman, who was progressive and liberal. Her mother was a conservative type of a housewife.

In 1947, she graduated from the department of foreign languages at Tsuda College. She also received a bachelor's degree in law from the University of Tokyo in 1950.

Career
Moriyama worked at the Ministry of Labor from 1950 to 1980. She was elected to the first of her three terms in the House of Councillors in 1980 and then to the House of Representatives for the first time in 1996. She headed the environment agency until 26 August 1989 when she was appointed chief cabinet secretary in the cabinet of Toshiki Kaifu. Moriyama replaced Tokuo Yamashita and became the first Japanese woman appointed to this post. She was dismissed after six months of tenure on 6 January 1990. Misoji Sakamoto succeeded her as chief cabinet secretary.

She was appointed Minister of Education to the cabinet of Prime Minister Kiichi Miyazawa on 12 November 1992. She was also Japan's first female education minister. She remained in office until 1993. She also served as Minister of Justice from 26 April 2001 to 19 November 2003 in the first cabinet of Prime Minister Junichiro Koizumi.

Moriyama became principal of Hakuoh University in 2007, and remained in that post until 2013.

Personal life
Moriyama is the widow of representative Kinji Moriyama. In 1991, she published a book, titled What I Saw in the Cabinet.

Death
Moriyama died in Tokyo at the age of 93 on 14 October 2021.

References

|-

|-

|-

|-

1927 births
2021 deaths
University of Tokyo alumni
Education ministers of Japan
Ministers of Justice of Japan
Members of the House of Representatives (Japan)
Members of the House of Councillors (Japan)
Women government ministers of Japan
Female members of the House of Representatives (Japan)
Female members of the House of Councillors (Japan)
Spouses of Japanese politicians
People from Tokyo
Liberal Democratic Party (Japan) politicians
21st-century Japanese politicians
21st-century Japanese women politicians
Female justice ministers